The R678 road is a regional road in Ireland, located in County Tipperary and County Waterford.

References

Regional roads in the Republic of Ireland
Roads in County Tipperary
Roads in County Waterford